Racket is an unincorporated community in Gilmer and Ritchie counties, West Virginia, United States. Their post office  has been closed.

References 

Unincorporated communities in West Virginia
Unincorporated communities in Gilmer County, West Virginia
Unincorporated communities in Ritchie County, West Virginia